Garners Beach is a coastal locality in the Cassowary Coast Region, Queensland, Australia.

Geography
The Coral Sea forms the eastern boundary and part of the northern boundary.

Garners Beach has the following beaches (from north to south):

 Garners Beach
 Brookes Beach, extending south into Bingil Bay

History
The suburb presumably takes its name from the beach, which in turn was named after pioneer settler Edward Garner who took up land there in 1890. He grew bananas and later established a refreshment room for visitors.

In 1928, Mr Garner's Beach was described as an excellent place for fishing and viewing coral.

By September 1937, Garners Beach Road had been was built to access the beach, leading to increased use by motor cars. It also facilitated a motor launch service to Garners Beach to link with a motor lorry service to El Arish for deliveries.

During World War II, the district was used as a practice firing range by the military.

Heritage listings
Garners Beach has the following heritage sites:
 Garners Beach Road: Garners Beach Burial Ground

Education 
There are no schools in Garners Beach. The nearest government primary school is El Arish State School in El Arish to the west. The nearest government secondary school is Tully State High School in Tully to the south-west.

References

Further reading

External links 

Cassowary Coast Region
Coastline of Queensland
Localities in Queensland